Chah Talekh (also Romanized as Chāh Talekh; also known as Ḩasanābād and Chahtālkh) is a village in Azari Rural District, in the Central District of Esfarayen County, North Khorasan Province, Iran. At the 2006 census, its population was 36, in 9 families.

References 

Populated places in Esfarayen County